Redemptor is a 2021 young adult fantasy novel by Nigerian American writer Jordan Ifueko. It is the sequel to Raybearer and the last book in the Raybearer duology, it was published on 17 August 2021 by Abrams Books.

Plot 
Set after the events of the first book, Empress Tarisai must form her own council of eleven connected by the Ray and work as the High Lady Judge alongside Emperor Ekundayo while also trying to fulfill her promise of sacrificing herself to the Abiku by going to the Underworld to stop the death of 200 Redemptor as the Ojiji, spirits of dead Redemptor children begins  to haunt her. 

Meanwhile, An activist called the Crocodile is turning the mind of peasants and miners away from the throne and he is trying to overthrown the rulers of Aristar. Tarisai must fight to defend the empire or else lose everything.

Reception 
The book received generally positive receptions from reviewers and readers. A review from Kirkus Reviews called the novel “A strong and worthy successor that showcases the skill of a master worldbuilder.” A review from NPR states that “Redemptor continues the breathtakingly beautiful tale of a young woman who is being torn apart by the responsibilities of being both empress and sacrifice”.
 
Alex Brown in a review for Locus stated that “this is a series begging to be reread. Jordan Ifueko’s West African-influenced duology is one of the best YA fantasies I’ve read in a long time”.
Buzzfeed named Redemptor one of the best books of August 2021, saying it was "[i]mmersive and gorgeously written."

Awards and Recognitions 

 Ignyte Awards for Best Novel for Young Adult Fiction, shortlisted (2022)
 Lodestar Award  for Best Young Adult Book, finalist 
 BSFA Award for Best Book for Young Readers, nominee (2021)
Andre Norton Award, nominee (2022)

References 

Nigerian fantasy novels
American fantasy novels
Young adult novels
2021 fantasy novels
2021 Nigerian novels
2021 American novels
American bildungsromans
Literature by African-American women
Abrams Books books